Georges Amédée Saint-Clair Mathias (14 October 182614 October 1910) was a French composer, pianist and teacher. Alongside his teaching work, Georges Mathias was a very active concert pianist.

Biography

Mathias was born in Paris. He studied at the Conservatoire de Paris with François Bazin, Auguste Barbereau, Augustin Savard and Fromental Halévy.  Privately, he studied composition with Friedrich Kalkbrenner and piano with Frédéric Chopin.

After finishing his studies, he taught piano at the Conservatoire from 1862 to 1893. Among his notable students were Teresa Carreño, Camille Chevillard, Paul Dukas, Camille Erlanger, James Huneker, Henri O'Kelly, Isidor Philipp, Raoul Pugno, Alfonso Rendano, Erik Satie, Eugénie Satie-Barnetche, Ernest Schelling, Ernesto Elorduy, José Tragó, and Alberto Williams.

Mathias and another Chopin's student Karol Mikuli had an important impact on passing his style on the next generations of musicians. Besides teaching, he was also active as a concert pianist. On 14 March 1864, he was the principal pianist at the premiere of Gioachino Rossini's Petite messe solennelle.

He was the recipient of the Legion of Honour in 1872.  He died in Paris in 1910, on his 84th birthday.

Works

His compositions include overtures to Hamlet and Mazeppa, five morceaux symphoniques for piano and strings, two piano concertos, six piano trios, a symphony, Oeuvres choisies pour le piano, Études de genre, Études de style et de mécanisme, a collection of two and four-hand piano pieces, and transcriptions including the one of some scenes from Mozart's The Magic Flute.

References

External links

Information about Mathias in other sources

1826 births
1910 deaths
French classical composers
French male composers
19th-century French male classical pianists
Conservatoire de Paris alumni
Piano pedagogues
Academic staff of the Conservatoire de Paris
Grand Croix of the Légion d'honneur
Musicians from Paris
Pupils of Fromental Halévy
Pupils of Frédéric Chopin
Burials at Montmartre Cemetery